The 2019 Swiss Open Gstaad (also known as the 2019 J. Safra Sarasin Swiss Open Gstaad for sponsorship reasons) was a men's tennis tournament played on outdoor clay courts. It was the 52nd edition of the Swiss Open, and part of the ATP Tour 250 Series of the 2019 ATP Tour. It took place at the Roy Emerson Arena in Gstaad, Switzerland, from 22 July through 29 July 2019.

ATP singles main draw entrants

Seeds 

 1 Rankings are as of July 15, 2019

Other entrants 
The following players received wildcards into the singles main draw:
  Sandro Ehrat 
  Marc-Andrea Hüsler 
  Tommy Robredo 

The following players received entry using a protected ranking into the main draw:
  Steve Darcis
  Cedrik-Marcel Stebe

The following players received entry from the qualifying draw:
  Filippo Baldi
  Daniel Elahi Galán 
  Gian Marco Moroni 
  Dennis Novak

Withdrawals 
Before the tournament
  Matteo Berrettini →replaced by  Jiří Veselý
  Guido Pella →replaced by  Thomas Fabbiano

ATP doubles main draw entrants

Seeds 

 Rankings are as of July 15, 2019

Other entrants 
The following pairs received wildcards into the doubles main draw:
 Sandro Ehrat /  Luca Margaroli
 Marc-Andrea Hüsler /  Jakub Paul

Champions

Singles 

  Albert Ramos Viñolas def.  Cedrik-Marcel Stebe, 6–3, 6–2

Doubles 

 Sander Gillé /  Joran Vliegen def.  Philipp Oswald /  Filip Polášek, 6–4, 6–3

External links

References 

Swiss Open Gstaad
Swiss Open (tennis)
2019 in Swiss tennis
July 2019 sports events in Switzerland